Halifax Choral Society is a choir based in the town of Halifax in the English county of West Yorkshire. It is notable for being the oldest amateur choral society in Britain (and possibly in the world) with an unbroken record of performance.

History 
The idea for the Halifax Choral Society (initially called Halifax Quarterly Choral Society) emerged from a discussion in late 1817 at a dinner party hosted at his home, Crow Trees in Lightcliffe, Halifax, for his musical friends by William Priestley, an eminent local musician, antiquary and literary gentleman. Late in 1817, at a dinner party  Priestley discussed the possibility of a permanent choir rather than the gatherings of singers that had presented concerts in the district for many years previously.

The choir has played an important role in the social and musical life of Halifax throughout its life, especially during the many civic and national celebrations which typified Imperial Britain in the nineteenth century. In the twentieth century the choir was able to keep going through the two world wars, and exploited the technology of radio, TV, and the gramophone and its descendants, to reach new audiences.

As well as performing with professional orchestras and top-ranking soloists, it performs with the highest ranking brass bands such as the Black Dyke Band from nearby Queensbury.  The choir maintains a friendly rivalry with neighbouring Huddersfield Choral Society. This may be due in part to the Halifax Choral Society interviewing and turning down the young Malcolm Sargent for the post of conductor, and then later seeing Sargent's enormous success as conductor in Huddersfield.

Halifax Choral Society has pioneered music by such composers as Mendelssohn and Haydn. Works have also been commissioned especially for the HCS.

Mozart manuscript 
The Choir made headlines when it presented, for the first time in modern history, a fascinating orchestration of Handel's oratorio Judas Maccabaeus. The score, which is attributed to Mozart, was found in the HCS archives where it had been preserved since the early 1850s, having been presented to HCS by the Choir's founder. The find inspired a TV recording of the first performance, broadcast in the UK and on Trio Arts (part of the Trio TV network) in the USA.

Bicentenary 

The Society held its bicentenary season in 2017–18 with a programme which included a new oratorio commission from Philip Wilby. The work is called The Holy Face, and features the story of the life and dramatic death of Halifax's patron saint – John the Baptist, whose head is pictured on the Halifax Coat of Arms. The final concert of the season was a reprise of the first of the first: on 9 February 1818, in the Halifax Court House, this was Haydn's The Creation.

References

External links 
Official website

Yorkshire choirs
Musical groups from West Yorkshire
Choral societies
Musical groups established in the 1810s
Halifax, West Yorkshire
1818 establishments in England